Thongsing Thammavong (Lao: ທອງສິງ ທຳມະວົງ; born 12 April 1944) is a Laotian politician who was the Prime Minister of Laos from 2010 to 2016. He is a member of the Lao People's Revolutionary Party (LPRP) and has been a member of the LPRP Politburo since 1991. He currently serves in the National Assembly of Laos, representing Luang Prabang Province (Constituency 6), and was the President of the National Assembly from 2006 to 2010. He became Prime Minister on 23 December 2010, and left office on 20 April 2016.

References

1944 births
Alternate members of the 3rd Central Committee of the Lao People's Revolutionary Party
Members of the 4th Central Committee of the Lao People's Revolutionary Party
Members of the 5th Central Committee of the Lao People's Revolutionary Party
Members of the 6th Central Committee of the Lao People's Revolutionary Party
Members of the 7th Central Committee of the Lao People's Revolutionary Party
Members of the 8th Central Committee of the Lao People's Revolutionary Party
Members of the 9th Central Committee of the Lao People's Revolutionary Party
Members of the 5th Politburo of the Lao People's Revolutionary Party
Members of the 6th Politburo of the Lao People's Revolutionary Party
Members of the 7th Politburo of the Lao People's Revolutionary Party
Members of the 8th Politburo of the Lao People's Revolutionary Party
Members of the 9th Politburo of the Lao People's Revolutionary Party
Lao People's Revolutionary Party politicians
Living people
Members of the National Assembly of Laos
Presidents of the National Assembly of Laos
Prime Ministers of Laos